"Right Place Right Time" is a song by English singer-songwriter Olly Murs. It was released in the United Kingdom on 25 August 2013 as the fourth single from his album of the same name. The song was written by Murs, Claude Kelly, Steve Robson and produced by Robson. The track reached No. 27 in the UK Top 40.

Background
The song was released on 25 August 2013 as a digital download bundle, which included a live version of the track recorded at Murs' headline show at London's O2 Arena. It also included remixes by Thomas Gandey and Steve Pitron & Max Sanna. Murs performed this song along with "Troublemaker" when he guest starred in an episode of the fifth season of 90210.

Music video
The video was uploaded to Murs's Vevo channel on 5 August 2013. It features clips from Murs's career including his X Factor audition, his time on the show, the Comic Relief desert trek, his arena tour, playing at Soccer Aid, as a child, meeting fans, his tour of the United States, his time on The Xtra Factor, filming his other music videos, photo shoots and his performances on Robbie Williams's Take the Crown Stadium Tour. Another part of the video which was filmed at Wembley features Murs in a dressing room playing a keyboard and guitar as well as trying on different outfits.

Live performances 

In April 2013, he made a guest appearance as himself on an episode of the fifth season of the American drama series 90210 and performed "Right Place Right Time" and "Troublemaker". In the United Kingdom, he performed the song the fourth semi-final results show of Britain's Got Talent.

Popular culture
The song featured in a trailer for the 2014 film Love, Rosie.

Track listing

Charts

Release history

References

2013 singles
2013 songs
Olly Murs songs
Epic Records singles
Song recordings produced by Steve Robson
Songs written by Olly Murs
Songs written by Claude Kelly
Songs written by Steve Robson
Pop ballads